LaHood is a surname. Notable people with the surname include:

 Darin LaHood (born 1968), American politician, son of Ray
 John LaHood (born 1979), American politician from Georgia
 Mike LaHood (born 1944), American football guard
 Nico LaHood (born 1972), American attorney and judge
 Ray LaHood (born 1945), American politician

See also
 Lahoud
 Ladhood